Mic'hael Goubron Brooks (born August 28, 1991) is a former Canadian football defensive tackle. He was most recently a member of the Edmonton Eskimos of the Canadian Football League (CFL). He played college football at East Carolina University and attended Bartlett Yancey High School in Yanceyville, North Carolina. He was a member of the Seattle Seahawks team that won Super Bowl XLVIII. Brooks has also been member of the Detroit Lions and BC Lions and Saskatchewan Roughriders.

Early years
Brooks played high school football for the Bartlett Yancey High School Buccaneers. He recorded 331 total tackles for the Buccaneers. He was a three-year all-region, all-conference, and defensive MVP selection. Brooks earned all-state honors as team captain his senior year after accumulating 94 tackles and 12.5 sacks. He represented North Carolina in the Shrine Bowl of the Carolinas All-Star Game. He was named the Danville Regional Defensive Player-of-the-Year in 2008. Brooks also earned a varsity letter in track and field.

College career
Brooks played in 43 games for the East Carolina Pirates from 2009 to 2012, recording 52 solo tackles and ten sacks. He also earned Conference USA All-Freshman honors.

Professional career

Detroit Lions
Brooks was signed by the Detroit Lions on May 2, 2013. He was released by the Lions on May 28, 2013.

Seattle Seahawks
The Seattle Seahawks claimed Brooks off waivers from the Detroit Lions on May 29, 2013. He was released by the Seahawks on August 31, 2013, and re-signed on September 2, 2013. He was released by the Seahawks on September 11, 2013, and signed to their practice squad on September 12, 2013. Brooks was signed to the active roster on November 9, 2013. He appeared in a game against the Atlanta Falcons on November 10, recording a tackle. He was released on November 11. Brooks was re-signed to the practice squad on December 19, 2013. Brooks was signed to a futures contract on February 5, 2014. The Seahawks later won Super Bowl XLVIII against the Denver Broncos. The Seahawks waived/injured Brooks on August 26, 2014. He was released by the Seahawks on September 1, 2014.

BC Lions
Brooks signed with the BC Lions on April 30, 2015. In two seasons with the Lions Brooks appeared in 28 games, accumulating 62 tackles and 4 quarterback sacks. He was named a CFL West All-Star for the 2015 season. Brooks will become a free-agent in February 2017.

On December 6, 2016, Brooks had a workout with the Minnesota Vikings. On December 14, 2016, he had a workout with the New England Patriots.

In February 2017, it was announced that Brooks has re-signed with the BC Lions for two more seasons, through 2018. In 2017 Brooks played in 15 games and contributed with 21 tackles and one quarterback sack. On May 18, 2018, Brooks was released by the Lions after they were unable to find another team willing to trade for him.

Saskatchewan Roughriders 
On June 24, 2018, Brooks signed with the Saskatchewan Roughriders (CFL). Brooks played in 11 games for the Riders in 2018, contributing 15 tackles. He suffered a season ending ankle injury in Week 18 of the season.

Edmonton Eskimos 
Brooks signed with the Edmonton Eskimos (CFL) on March 19, 2019. He was released by the club on May 20, 2019.

References

External links

 
 Canadian Football League profile
 
 BC Lions profile
 
 Just Sports Stats profile

1991 births
Living people
African-American players of American football
African-American players of Canadian football
American football defensive tackles
BC Lions players
Canadian football defensive linemen
Detroit Lions players
East Carolina Pirates football players
Players of American football from North Carolina
Seattle Seahawks players
Sportspeople from Durham, North Carolina
Saskatchewan Roughriders players
People from Yanceyville, North Carolina
21st-century African-American sportspeople